T. Canby Jones (September 21, 1921 in Karuizawa, Japan – February 13, 2014) was an advocate of the War of the Lamb, a Quaker peace activist, a professor emeritus of Wilmington College in Ohio, and was a student of Thomas R. Kelly. T. Canby Jones died  in Paoli Memorial Hospital, suburban Philadelphia, Pennsylvania.

Jones was a son of Esther Alsop Balderston Jones (1894(?)–1967) and Thomas E. Jones (1888–1973), who was president of Fisk University, 1926–1946, and of Earlham College, 1946–1958. He graduated from Westtown Friends' Boarding School (1938), Haverford College (1942), and Yale University (1955), where he earned divinity and Ph.D. degrees.

During World War II he was a conscientious objector, serving primarily in a Civilian Public Service camp in Trenton, North Dakota.  He married Helen Eunice Meeks while in CPS on August 19, 1945.  Immediately after the war he and his wife went to Finnmark province in north Norway where they did postwar reconstruction work under the auspices of the American Friends Service Committee.

He served as a Professor of Religion & Philosophy at Wilmington College from 1955 until his retirement in 1987. His book publications include George Fox's Attitude Toward War; A Documentary Study (Friends United Press, 1984), "The Power of the Lord Is Over All": The Pastoral Letters of George Fox (Friends United Press, 1989), and Thomas R. Kelly As I Remember Him (Pendle Hill, 1989).

He was a founding member of the Friends Association for Higher Education (FAHE), and a charter member of Campus Friends Meeting in Wilmington, Ohio. His professional and personal papers are held by the S. Arthur Watson Library Special Collections, Wilmington College (Ohio).

See also
Daniel L. Smith-Christopher

References
Brief biography provided by Watson Library College Archive, Wilmington College (Ohio), which holds the T. Canby Jones Papers and Personal Archive.
He is the subject of the book Practiced In The Presence: Essays In Honor of T. Canby Jones (Friends United Press, 1994).

External links
The Lamb Shall Overcome

Wilmington College (Ohio)
Haverford College alumni
Yale University alumni
American Quakers
2014 deaths
1921 births
American conscientious objectors
Members of the Civilian Public Service